Vallikkunnu railway station is situated at Ariyallur, Vallikkunnu, Malappuram district, Kerala, India. It is one of the oldest railway stations in Kerala. This railway station was a part of first rail route (Tirur-Chaliyam) in Kerala.  The station code for Vallikkunnu set by Indian Railway is VLI which can be used for various purposes including online reservations.

References

Railway stations in Malappuram district
Palakkad railway division